Prenelan Subrayen (born 23 September 1993) is a South African cricketer who made his debut in November 2011. In August 2017, he was named in Durban Heat's squad for the first season of the T20 Global League. However, in October 2017, Cricket South Africa initially postponed the tournament until November 2018, with it being cancelled soon after.

In September 2019, he was named in the squad for the Durban Heat team for the 2019 Mzansi Super League tournament. Later the same month, he was named in KwaZulu-Natal's squad for the 2019–20 CSA Provincial T20 Cup. He was the leading wicket-taker in the 2019–20 CSA 4-Day Franchise Series, with 38 dismissals in seven matches. In April 2021, he was named in KwaZulu-Natal's squad, ahead of the 2021–22 cricket season in South Africa.

In May 2021, Subrayen was named in South Africa's Test squad for their series against the West Indies. In December 2021, Subrayen received another call-up to South Africa's Test squad, this time for their home series against India.

References

External links
 

1993 births
Living people
South African cricketers
Dolphins cricketers
KwaZulu-Natal cricketers
Durban Heat cricketers
Durban's Super Giants cricketers